Anna Krystyna Lubomirska is the name of:

Anna Krystyna Lubomirska (d. 1667) (1618–1667), Polish noblewoman
Anna Krystyna Lubomirska (d. 1701) (17th-century–1701), Polish noble lady